Tomás Granitto Heesch (born June 12, 1993) is a Salvadoran professional footballer who plays for FAS.

Career
Granitto played college soccer at Florida Gulf Coast University, before signing with El Salvadorian club CD Luis Ángel Firpo in 2013.

After leaving Firpo, Granitto spent time with the reserve team of FC Dallas, before joining North American Soccer League side FC Edmonton on November 12, 2014.

On March 4, 2016, Granitto signed with USL side the Swope Park Rangers.

Granitto joined USL side Portland Timbers 2 in March 2017.

Granitto made his debut for the senior El Salvador national football team on March 26, 2019. The match was a 2–0 victory for El Salvador over Peru, played at RFK Stadium in Washington, D.C.

Honours

Club
FAS
Salvadoran Primera División: Clausura 2021

References

External links
Edmonton bio

1993 births
Living people
Salvadoran people of Argentine descent
Salvadoran footballers
Salvadoran expatriate footballers
Association football midfielders
Florida Gulf Coast Eagles men's soccer players
FC Edmonton players
Sporting Kansas City II players
Portland Timbers 2 players
Miami FC players
North American Soccer League players
USL Championship players
National Premier Soccer League players
National Independent Soccer Association players
Expatriate soccer players in the United States
Expatriate soccer players in Canada
El Salvador international footballers